Ethmia dimauraorum is a moth in the family Depressariidae.

The ground colour of the forewings is whitish mostly covered with irregular dark brown elongated markings except by the apex. There are two distinct dark brown dots at the base of the posterior half. The terminal line is composed of eight blackish dots from before the costa to the tornus. The hindwing ground colour is brown, darker at the apex.

Etymology
The species is named in honor of Paul and Karen Dimaura, who have allowed the University of Pennsylvania to support Daniel H. Janzen and Winnie Hallwachs full-time in their efforts to facilitate the germination and growth of Area de Conservación Guanacaste, INBio, and the Guanacaste Dry Forest Conservation Fund.

References

Moths described in 2014
dimauraorum